Don Quixote, fully El ingenioso hidalgo Don Quijote de la Mancha, is a classic novel by Miguel de Cervantes Saavedra, originally published in two parts, in 1605 and 1615.

Don Quixote or Quixote (with variations in spelling) may also refer to:

Arts, entertainment and media

Film 
 Don Quixote (1903 film), a French silent film directed by  Ferdinand Zecca and Lucien Nonguet
 Don Quixote (1923 film), a British silent film directed by Maurice Elvey
 Don Quixote (1926 film), a Danish silent film directed by Lau Lauritzen Sr.
 Don Quixote (1933 film), a French–British film by G. W. Pabst
 Don Quixote de la Mancha (1947 film), a Spanish film directed by Rafael Gil
 Don Quixote (1957 film), a Soviet film directed by Grigori Kozintsev
 I, Don Quixote, a 1959 CBS DuPont Show of the Month television play
 Don Quixote (unfinished film), directed by Orson Welles and filmed between 1955 and 1969
 Don Quijote cabalga de nuevo, a Spanish-Mexican 1973 film starring Cantinflas
 Don Quixote (1973 film), a 1973 Australian ballet film
 The Adventures of Don Quixote, a 1973 BBC Play of the Month
 Don Quixote of La Mancha (1987 film), a 1987 animated film produced by Burbank Films Australia
 Don Quixote (2000 film), an American TV film directed by Peter Yates and starring John Lithgow
 Donkey Xote, a 2007 Spanish-Italian animated film directed by Jose Pozo
 Don Quixote (2010 film), a Chinese film directed by Ah Gan
 Don Quixote (2015 film), an American film featuring James Franco
 The Man Who Killed Don Quixote, a 2018 British film directed by Terry Gilliam

Music 
 Bourlesque de Quixotte (TWV 55:G10), an orchestral suite by Georg Philipp Telemann, composed c. 1761 
 Don Quichotte à Dulcinée (composed between 1932 and 1933), a three-song cycle by Maurice Ravel
 Don Quixote (Strauss), a tone poem by Richard Strauss that premiered in 1898
 Don Quixote, A Musical Picture after Cervantes, Op. 87 (1869) by Anton Rubinstein

Ballet 
 Don Quixote (ballet) (1869), choreographed by Marius Petipa to the music of Ludwig Minkus
 Don Quixote, choreographed by Dame Ninette de Valois to music by Roberto Gerhard in 1950
 Don Quixote, choreographed by George Balanchine to the music of Nicolas Nabokov, premiered in 1965

Opera 
 Don Quixote (opera) (1898), by Wilhelm Kienzl
 Don Chisciotte in Sierra Morena (1719), by Francesco Bartolomeo Conti
 Don Quichotte (1864), rearranged by Victorien Sardou and Charles-Louis-Etienne Nuitter and music by Maurice Renaud
 Don Quichotte (1910), by Jules Massenet
 Don Quichotte auf der Hochzeit des Comacho (1761), by Georg Philipp Telemann (TWV 21:32)
 Don Quichotte chez la Duchesse (1743), by Joseph Bodin de Boismortier
 Don Quijote (2000), by Cristóbal Halffter

Albums and songs
 Don Quixote (album), a 1972 album by Gordon Lightfoot which also featured a song titled "Don Quixote"
 "Don Quichotte (No Están Aquí)" (1984), a song by Magazine 60
"Don Quixote Marijuana", a 1999 parody of the Magazine 60 song by Brujeria
 "Don Quijote" (1981), a song by Neoton Família
 "Don Quixote" (Nik Kershaw song), a 1984 song by Nik Kershaw
 "Don Quixote", a 2001 song by Pencey Prep
 "Don Quixote", a 2016 song by Drapht featuring Hilltop Hoods
 "Don Quixote", a 2010 song by Coldplay
 "Don Quixote", a 2022 song by Seventeen

Television
 Don Quixote (TV series), a 2011 Japanese television series
 Quijote TV, a Venezuelan TV channel
 Don Quixote, a character from One Piece that is from the Quixote pirates

Theatre
 The Comical History of Don Quixote, a 1694 three-part play by Thomas d'Urfey
 Don Quixote (play), a theatre play written by Mikhail Bulgakov

Visual arts
 Don Quixote (Picasso), a 1955 sketch by Pablo Picasso
 Don Quixote (Teno), a 1976 sculpture by Aurelio Teno

Other arts, entertainment and media 
 Donquixote Doflamingo, a character in the anime and manga, One Piece
 Quixote (1954-1960), a literary magazine edited by Jean Rikhoff

Science and technology

Astronomy
 QUIJOTE CMB Experiment, a cosmic microwave background experiment, based in Tenerife
 3552 Don Quixote, an asteroid
 Don Quijote (spacecraft), an unmanned space mission proposed by the European Space Agency
 Quijote (planet), or mu Arae b, an extrasolar planet

Computing
 Quixote (web framework), a software framework for developing web application in Python

Other uses
 Don Quijote Airport, a closed airport south of Ciudad Real, Spain
 Don Quichotte (magazine), a defunct French language weekly in Egypt  
 Quixote (crossword compiler), Don Manley (born 1945)
 Don Quijote (store), a discount store with locations in Japan, Hawaii and Singapore
 Don Quixote Pond, a pond in Antarctica

See also
 Don Q (disambiguation)
 Man of La Mancha, a play based on I, Don Quixote
 Man of La Mancha (film), based on I, Don Quixote